The Second & Final Season HBO Comedy Series Vice Principals

Cast

Main 
Danny McBride as Neal Gamby
Walton Goggins as Lee Russell
Dale Dickey as Nash
Georgia King as Amanda Snodgrass
Sheaun McKinney as Dayshawn
Busy Philipps as Gale Liptrapp
Shea Whigham as Ray Liptrapp

Recurring 
Maya G. Love as Janelle Gamby
Edi Patterson as Jen Abbott
Kimberly Hébert Gregory as Dr. Belinda Brown
Susan Park as Christine Russell
Mike O'Gorman as Bill Hayden
Madelyn Cline as Taylor Watts
James M. Connor as Martin Seychelles
Robin Bartlett as Octavia LeBlanc
Brian Howe as Jeremy Haas
Marcius Harris as Officer Terrence Willows
Conner McVicker as Robin Shandrell
Fisher Stevens as Brian Biehn
Christopher Thornton as Mr. Milner
Brian Tyree Henry as Dascious Brown

Episodes

References

2017 American television seasons